Monforte de la Sierra is a village and small municipality in the province of Salamanca,  western Spain, part of the autonomous community of Castile-Leon.

Geography

References

Municipalities in the Province of Salamanca